The following is a list of notable deaths in April 2012.

Entries for each day are listed alphabetically by surname.  A typical entry lists information in the following sequence:
Name, age, country of citizenship and reason for notability, established cause of death, reference (and language of reference, if not English).

Follow consistency

April 2012

1
Nancy Beckage, 61, American entomologist.
Ekrem Bora, 78, Turkish actor, pulmonary edema.
Alvin J. Boutte, 82, American banker and businessman.
Lionel Bowen, 89, Australian politician, MP for Kingsford-Smith (1969–1990); Deputy Prime Minister (1983–1990), pneumonia.
Sauro Bufalini, 70, Italian Olympic basketball player.
Chang Mei-yao, 71, Taiwanese actress.
Giorgio Chinaglia, 65, Italian footballer (Lazio, New York Cosmos), heart attack.
Miguel de la Madrid, 77, Mexican politician, President (1982–1988), complications of pulmonary emphysema.
Leila Denmark, 114, American supercentenarian, author, and physician, credited with developing a whooping cough vaccine.
Peter M. Douglas, 69, German American environmental activist, lung and throat cancer.
Klaus Dylewski, 95, German SS officer.
Jamaa Fanaka, 68, American filmmaker.
Sir Stan Yapp, 70, English politician.

2
Jesús Aguilarte, 53, Venezuelan politician, Governor of Apure State (1999–2000; 2004–2011), shot.
Russell Allen, 99, American cyclist.
Benhuan, 104, Chinese Buddhist master, honorary president of the Buddhist Association of China.
Rosario Bentivegna, 89, Italian partisan and doctor.
Warren Bonython, 95, Australian conservationist, explorer, author, and chemical engineer.
Roger Breske, 73, American politician, member of the Wisconsin State Senate (1990–2008).
Elizabeth Catlett, 96, American-born Mexican artist.
Allie Clark, 88, American baseball player (Cleveland Indians, Philadelphia Athletics).
Jim Delaney, 91, American Olympic silver medal-winning (1948) shot putter.
Sarah Dreher, 75, American novelist and playwright.
Pilar Fuertes Ferragut, 49, Spanish diplomat.
Rychard Karpov, 80, Ukrainian Olympic boxer.
John Kuenster, 87, American sportswriter, editor of Baseball Digest.
Mauricio Lasansky, 97, Argentinian-born American printmaker.
Jimmy Little, 75, Australian singer.
Felice Ludovisi, 94, Italian painter.
Alan Ruddock, 68, Irish martial artist and teacher.
M. Saroja, 79, Indian film actress.
Neslişah Sultan, 91, Turkish-born Ottoman and Egyptian royal, heart attack.

3
Amer Al Midani, 55, Lebanese businessman.
Lorne Benson, 81, Canadian football player (Winnipeg Blue Bombers).
Arduino Bertoldo, 79, Italian Roman Catholic prelate, Bishop of Foligno (1992–2008).
Michael Bzdel, 81, Canadian Ukrainian Catholic hierarch, Metropolitan of Winnipeg (1992–2006).
Richard Descoings, 53, French academic director (Institut d'Études Politiques de Paris).
Frank Fucarino, 91, American basketball player (Toronto Huskies). 
Nicholas King, 79, American actor, preserved the Watts Towers.
Efraím Basílio Krevey, 83, Brazilian Ukrainian Catholic hierarch, Bishop of São João Batista em Curitiba (1978–2006).
Mingote, 93, Spanish cartoonist, writer, and journalist.
Govind Narain, 95, Indian civil servant, Governor of Karnataka (1977–1983).
Airton Pavilhão, 77, Brazilian footballer. 
Xenia Stad-de Jong, 90, Dutch Olympic gold medal-winning (1948) athlete. 
Chief Jay Strongbow, 83, American professional wrestler (WWF).
José María Zárraga, 81, Spanish footballer and manager. (Spanish)

4
Muhammad Afrizal, 30, Indonesian boxer, PABA featherweight champion (2008), injuries sustained from bout.
A. Dean Byrd, 64, American psychologist.
Dimitris Christoulas, 77, Greek pensioner, suicide.
Eugénie De Keyser, 93, Belgian writer and art critic.
Joe Doyle, 78–79, Irish cyclist.
Anne Karin Elstad, 74, Norwegian author, stroke. 
Ficre Ghebreyesus, 50, Eritrean-American artist, heart failure.
Josiah Henson, 90, American Olympic bronze medal-winning (1952) wrestler, stroke and myocardial infarction.
Aminul Islam, 40, Bangladeshi trade union leader.
Nikolay Krasovsky, 87, Russian mathematician. 
Claude Miller, 70, French director, producer, and screenwriter.
Helge Sverre Nesheim, 92, Norwegian broadcaster. 
Richard Okada, 66, American linguist, Professor of Japanese at Princeton University.
Dubravko Pavličić, 44, Croatian footballer. 
Roberto Rexach Benítez, 82, Puerto Rican politician, President of the Senate (1993–1996).

5
Keith Adams, 85, Australian adventurer and filmmaker.
Joe Avezzano, 68, American football player (Boston Patriots) and coach (Dallas Cowboys, Oakland Raiders), heart attack.
David Axon, 61, British astrophysicist.
Pedro Bartolomé Benoit, 91, Dominican military general, Provisional President (1965).
Angelo Castro, Jr., 67, Filipino journalist, The World Tonight anchor (1986–2009, 2011–2012), lung cancer.
Cynthia Dall, 41, American musician.
Attila Hazai, 44, Hungarian writer, suicide.
Jim Herr, 87, American businessman, founder of Herr's Snacks.
Jimmy Lawlor, 78, Irish footballer.
Jim Marshall, 88, English businessman, founder of Marshall Amplification.
Barney McKenna, 72, Irish musician (The Dubliners).
Bingu wa Mutharika, 78, Malawian politician, President (since 2004), heart attack.
Gil Noble, 80, American television reporter and host (Like It Is).
Ferdinand Alexander Porsche, 76, German designer.
Siegbert Salomon Prawer, 87, German-born British academic and writer.
Bernard Rapoport, 94, American businessman and philanthropist.
Regal Classic, 27, Canadian Thoroughbred racehorse, euthanized.
A. G. L. Shaw, 96, Australian historian.
Stanislav Strnad, 81, Czech film director.
Sir Peter Tapsell, 82, New Zealand politician, Speaker of the House of Representatives (1993–1996).
Dick Wearmouth, 85, Australian football player.
Christer Zetterberg, 70, Swedish businessman.

6
Boraî Bashir, 80, Sudanese footballer.
Larry Canning, 86, English footballer (Aston Villa) and broadcaster, vascular dementia.
Karl P. Cohen, 99, American mathematical physicist.
 Robin Denniston, 85, British book publisher.
*Fang Lizhi, 76, Chinese political activist and astrophysicist.
*Felipe Fernández García, 76, Spanish Roman Catholic prelate, Bishop of Ávila (1976–1991) and San Cristóbal de La Laguna o Tenerife (1991–2005).
Promode Gogoi, 82, Indian politician.
Dermot Hannafin (Snr), 84, Irish football player.
Theunis Jonck, 86, South African Olympic weightlifter.
Thomas Kinkade, 54, American painter, overdose of alcohol and Valium.
 Thomas Sancton, Sr., 97, American novelist and journalist.
Michael Sands, 66, American show business publicist and alleged CIA operative, choked.
Arnold Saul, 87, American tennis player and coach.
Sheila Scotter, 91, Australian fashion editor (Vogue Australia).
Reed Whittemore, 92, American poet.

7
Michaelina Bellamy, 59, American singer, dancer, and actress, acute myeloid leukemia.
Arthur Budd, 66, Australian footballer.
Dennis De Souza, 77, Guyanese musician.
Steven Kanumba, 28, Tanzanian actor and director.
Alexander Leslie-Melville, 14th Earl of Leven, 87, Scottish peer and soldier, Lord Lieutenant of Nairn (1969–1999).
*Miss Read, 98, English writer.
Satsue Mito, 97, Japanese zoologist.
*Ignatius Moses I Daoud, 81, Syrian Catholic cardinal, Patriarch of Antioch (1998–2001), stroke complications.
David E. Pergrin, 94, American soldier, led the most decorated World War II engineering battalion.
Bashir Ahmed Qureshi, 54, Pakistani politician, cardiac arrest.
Tom Runnels, 78, American football player (Washington Redskins).
Harold Robert Steacy, 88, Canadian mineralogist.
Serafym (Verzun), 62, Ukrainian Orthodox hierarch, Bishop of Zhytomyr (1992–1995), Archbishop of Rivne (1995–2000) and Kirovohrad (2002–2008). 
Anders Thor, 76, Swedish scientist and educator.
Mike Wallace, 93, American news correspondent (60 Minutes).
Jamshid Zokirov, 63, Uzbek actor.

8
Mark Ayers, 63, American labor leader.
Gordon Bagier, 87, British politician, MP for Sunderland South (1964–1987).
Bram Bart, 49, Dutch voice actor, pancreatic cancer. (Dutch)
Pat Carlin, 82, English footballer.
Juventino Castro y Castro, 93, Mexican judge and politician.
John Egan, 59, Irish Gaelic footballer.
June Gibbs, 89, American politician, cancer.
George Wilberforce Kakoma, 89, Ugandan musician, composer of the Ugandan national anthem.
Blair Kiel, 50, American football player (Green Bay Packers, Indianapolis Colts, Tampa Bay Buccaneers), heart attack.
Donal O'Brien, 72, Irish hurler.
Anatoly Ravikovich, 75, Russian film actor (The Pokrovsky Gate), cancer. (Russian)
Jack Tramiel, 83, Polish-born American businessman, founder of Commodore and CEO of Atari.
Al Veigel, 95, American baseball player (Boston Braves).
Rikiya Yasuoka, 64, Japanese actor and singer, heart failure.
Janusz K. Zawodny, 90, Polish-born American historian, World War II resistance fighter.

9
Carol Adams, 94, American actress and dancer.
Takeshi Aono, 75, Japanese voice actor (Dragon Ball, One Piece), post-operative multiple cerebral infarction. 
Reginald Askew, 83, British priest and academic.
Richard Beyer, 85, American sculptor.
Lester Breslow, 97, American physician.
François Brigneau, 92, French journalist and author.
Barry Cahill, 90, Canadian-born American actor (Grand Theft Auto, Sweet Bird of Youth).
Dick Cullum, 81, English footballer.
John Golding, 82, British artist, art scholar and curator.
José Guardiola, 81, Spanish singer (Eurovision Song Contest 1963).
Ismail Haron, 66, Singaporean singer.
Mark Lenzi, 43, American Olympic gold medal-winning (1992) diver, hypotension.
Wiebo Ludwig, 70, Canadian environmental activist and convicted bomber, esophageal cancer.
Miriam Mafai, 86, Italian journalist (La Repubblica), author and politician.
Ivan Nagel, 80, German theater director. 
Simo Nikolić, 71, Croatian Olympic sailor. (Croatian)
Meral Okay, 53, Turkish actress and screenwriter (Muhteşem Yüzyıl), cancer.
Boris Parygin, 81, Russian philosopher and sociologist. (Russian)
Don Reed, 92, American football coach (Long Beach State 49ers), natural causes.
Robert R. Sokal, 86, Austrian-born American biostatistician and entomologist.
Malcolm Thomas, 82, Welsh rugby union player.

10
Svein Aasmundstad, 77, Norwegian civil servant. 
John Anderson, 69, Northern Irish bioengineer.
*Luis Aponte Martínez, 89, Puerto Rican Roman Catholic prelate and first cardinal, Metropolitan Archbishop of San Juan de Puerto Rico (1964–1999). 
Erdoğan Arıca, 57, Turkish football coach, lung cancer.
Raymond Aubrac, 97, French WWII resistance fighter.
Leonardo Mario Bernacchi, 79, Italian-born Bolivian Roman Catholic prelate, Vicar Apostolic of Camiri (1993–2009).
Frank Bochow, 74, German trade unionist and diplomat.
Barbara Buchholz, 52, German musician and composer, cancer. 
Virginia Spencer Carr, 82, American biographer.
Maria-Pia Casilio, 76, Italian film actress. (Italian)
Lili Chookasian, 90, American opera singer.
Kurt Crain, 47, American football player (Houston Oilers, Green Bay Packers).
Dorothy Dermody, 102, Irish Olympic (1948) fencer.
Zvi Dinstein, 86, Israeli politician, MK (1965–1974), pulmonary embolism. 
Carl Gatto, 74, American politician, member of the Alaska House of Representatives (since 2003), prostate cancer.
Tichaona Mudzingwa, 69, Zimbabwean politician.
Odd Rikard Olsen, 64, Norwegian newspaper editor and politician.
Akin Omoboriowo, 81, Nigerian lawyer and politician.
Andy Replogle, 58, American baseball player (Milwaukee Brewers).
Afewerk Tekle, 80, Ethiopian artist, complications of stomach ulcer.
Grant Tilly, 74, New Zealand actor (30 Days of Night).
Carlos Truan, 76, American politician.
N. Varadarajan, 88, Indian politician.
John Weaver, 92, American sculptor.

11
Julio Alemán, 79, Mexican actor, cancer. 
Ghamar Ariyan, 90, Iranian researcher and author.
Ahmed Ben Bella, 93, Algerian politician, Prime Minister (1962–1963); President (1963–1965).
Misbach Yusa Biran, 78, Indonesian film director.
Roger Caron, 73, Canadian author, prison escape artist, and bank robber, infection.
Eugene V. Clark, 86, American Roman Catholic priest. 
Steve Cokely, 59, American political researcher and lecturer.
Tippy Dye, 97, American college athlete, coach, and athletic director.
Peter Gerber, 88, Swiss politician.
Gustaf Jansson, 90, Swedish Olympic bronze medal-winning (1952) athlete. (Swedish)
Keith Leeson, 83, Australian Olympic hockey player.
Bob Lewis, 86, American college basketball player (University of Utah).
Gianni Marchetti, 78, Italian composer and songwriter. 
Moses Majekodunmi, 95, Nigerian politician, Minister of Health (1960–66).
Hal McKusick, 87, American jazz saxophonist, clarinetist, and flautist, natural causes.
Yolanda Mérida, 82, Mexican actress. 
Rainer Penkert, 90, German actor.
Agustin Roman, 83, Cuban-born American Roman Catholic prelate, Auxiliary Bishop of Miami (1979–2003), heart attack.

12
Uno Anton, 70, Estonian politician.
Vladimir Astapovsky, 65, Soviet Olympic bronze medal-winning (1976) footballer. 
Kellon Baptiste, 38, Grenadian footballer, cancer.
Mohit Chattopadhyay, 77, Indian playwright, dramatist, and poet, cancer.
Linda Cook, 63, American actress.
Nico dei Gabbiani, 67, Italian singer. (Italian)
Elizabeth Ferris, 71, British Olympic bronze medal-winning (1960) diver.
James Gallen, 83, American politician, complications from appendicitis.
David Alan Gore, 58, American convicted serial killer, execution by lethal injection.
Rodgers Grant, 76, American jazz pianist, cancer.
Steinbjørn B. Jacobsen, 74, Faroese poet and writer, Faroese Literature Prize recipient. (Faroese)
Robert Kennedy, 73, Canadian publisher, complications from skin cancer.
Andrew Love, 70, American saxophonist (The Memphis Horns), complications of Alzheimer's disease.
Masakre, 57, Mexican professional wrestler, cancer.
Bruce Morrison, 88, Australian football player.
Manfred Orzessek, 78, German footballer. (German)
Amy Tryon, 42, American Olympic bronze medal-winning (2004) equestrian, accidental drug overdose.

13
Miguel Albareda Creus, 93, Spanish chess player.
Eunice Alberts, 84–85, American contralto.
Victor Arnold, 75, American actor.
Irving K. Barber, 89, Canadian forester and philanthropist.
John Blane, 82, American diplomat, United States Ambassador to Rwanda (1982–1985); Chad (1985–1988).
William B. Buffum, 90, American diplomat, US Ambassador to Lebanon (1970–1974), natural causes.
Cecil Chaudhry, 70, Pakistani fighter pilot, school principal, and activist, lung cancer.
Florin Constantiniu, 79, Romanian historian.
Erland Cullberg, 81, Swedish artist.
William Alden Edson, 99, American scientist and engineer.
Avraham Goldberg, 99, American-born Israeli Talmud scholar.
Verónica Gómez, 26, Venezuelan volleyball player, heart failure.
Shūichi Higurashi, 75, Japanese manga illustrator, painted cover for Big Comic (1970–2011), pneumonia.
Ruth Davis Kohrt, 90, American librarian and novelist.
Marilyn Lovell Matz, 81, American actress (Ghosts of Mississippi), therapist and activist.
Peter Mullins, 86, Australian Olympic decathlete (1948), basketball player, and coach.
Lewis Nordan, 72, American writer, pneumonia.
Mario Rizzi, 86, Italian Roman Catholic prelate, Titular Archbishop of Bagnoregio (since 1991), Apostolic Nuncio to Bulgaria (1991–1996).
David S. Smith, 94, American diplomat, United States Ambassador to Sweden (1976–1977).
 Robert Wigmore, 62, Cook Islands politician.

14
Celal Başkale, Turkish Kurdish politician, killed.
Émile Bouchard, 92, Canadian ice hockey player (Montreal Canadiens), member of the Hockey Hall of Fame.
Tom Farrell, 87, Canadian politician.
William Finley, 69, American actor (Phantom of the Paradise), complications from surgery.
C. Miller Fisher, 98, Canadian neurologist.
Jonathan Frid, 87, Canadian actor (Dark Shadows), natural causes.
Bela Gold, 97, Hungarian-born American businessman and professor.
Ma Jaya, 71, American spiritual teacher, pancreatic cancer.
Lee Kyung-hwan, 24, South Korean footballer (Suwon Bluewings), suicide by jumping.
Eddie May, 68, English football player and manager.
Piermario Morosini, 25, Italian footballer (Livorno), cardiac arrest.
Martin Poll, 89, American film producer (The Lion in Winter), natural causes.
Edward Purrington, 82, American opera director.
Paulo César Saraceni, 78, Brazilian film director.
Vincent F. Seyfried, 93, American historian.
Per G. Stavnum, 70, Norwegian diplomat, ambassador to Lithuania (1991–1996); Vietnam (2000–2005). (Norwegian)
Synchronised, 9, Irish racehorse, euthanised after race fall.
Viro the Virus, 33, American hip hop artist.
Mikhail Voronin, 73, Ukrainian fashion designer.
Cathie Wright, 82, American politician, California State Senator (1992–2000).

15
Fred Birchmore, 100, American adventurer.
Paul Bogart, 92, American Emmy Award-winning television director (All in the Family), natural causes.
Jesús Giles Sánchez, 50, Mexican politician, cancer.
Hans Johansson, 85, Swedish Olympic equestrian. (Swedish)
Peter McKenzie, 59, New Zealand conservationist, cancer.
Yasushi Mieno, 88, Japanese banker, Governor of the Bank of Japan (1989–1994), cardiac arrest.
Jenny Olsson, 32, Swedish Olympic cross-country skier, cancer. 
Bob Perani, 69, Italian-born American ice hockey player (Flint Generals).
Aleksandr Porokhovshchikov, 73, Russian actor, complications from diabetes and stroke. 
Murray Rose, 73, Australian Olympic gold medal-winning (1956, 1960) swimmer, leukaemia.
Samir Said, 48, Kuwaiti footballer, traffic collision.
Rich Saul, 64, American football player (Los Angeles Rams), leukemia.
Dwayne Schintzius, 43, American basketball player (New Jersey Nets), respiratory failure.
James Shaner, 75, American politician, member of the Pennsylvania House of Representatives (1995–2006).
Joan Tozzer, 90, American figure skater.
Bob Wright, 86, American college basketball coach (Morehead State University).
Tadashi Yamamoto, 76, Japanese businessman, founder of the Japan Center for International Exchange, gall bladder cancer.

16
Sári Barabás, 98, Hungarian-born German opera singer, stroke. 
Marian Biskup, 89, Polish historian. 
Laura Bornholdt, 93, American historian and academic administrator.
Ernest Callenbach, 83, American writer and environmentalist.
Teddy Charles, 84, American jazz musician and composer.
Jack Cohen, 93, American rabbi.
Ray Davey, 97, Northern Irish Presbyterian minister, founder of the Corrymeela Community.
Jean Fréchaut, 97, French cyclist.
Margalith Galun, 85, Israeli lichenologist, after a lengthy illness.
Alan Hacker, 73, British clarinetist.
George Kunda, 56, Zambian politician, Vice President (2008–2011), anaemia.
A.F. Millidge, 98, British arachnologist.
Mærsk Mc-Kinney Møller, 98, Danish shipping magnate.
Antoine Hamid Mourany, 82, Lebanese-born Syrian Maronite hierarch, Metropolitan of Damascus (1989–1999).
Arthur Nadel, 80, American fund manager and convicted embezzler.
* Ngô Đình Lệ Quyên, 53, South Vietnamese-born Italian lawyer, daughter of Madame Nhu, traffic collision.
Oyalı, 4, Turkish sheep, first cloned animal in Turkey, lung disease.
Carlo Petrini, 64, Italian footballer.
Graham Simpson, 68, British musician (Roxy Music).
Randy Starkman, 51, Canadian sports journalist, pneumonia.
 Jack Streidl, 93, American football coach.

17
Alexander Appleford, 90, English pilot.
Barry Askew, 75, British newspaper editor (News of the World).
Walter M. Baker, 84, American politician.
Leila Berg, 94, British children's author.
J. Quinn Brisben, 77, American civil rights activist and Socialist candidate for U.S. President in 1992.
Jake Carter, 87, American basketball player.
Tim Collins, 66, American golfer.
Michael Green, New Zealand diplomat, cancer. (death announced on this date)
Stan Johnson, 75, American baseball player (Chicago White Sox, Kansas City Athletics).
Almasbei Kchach, 53, Abkhazian politician, suicide.
Sukenobu Kudō, 84, Japanese speed skater (1952 Winter Olympics), renal failure. (Japanese)
Irving Millman, 88, American virologist and microbiologist.
Dimitris Mitropanos, 64, Greek singer, pulmonary edema.
Nityananda Mahapatra, 99, Indian politician, poet, and journalist, natural causes.
Jonathan V. Plaut, 69, American rabbi.
Ben H. Procter, 85, American author and football player (Los Angeles Rams), Parkinson's disease.
Stanley Rogers Resor, 94, American lawyer, Secretary of the Army (1965–1971).
Jane Schaberg, 74, American biblical scholar.
Dom Valentino, 83, American sports broadcaster.
Louis Vorster, 45, South African-born Namibian cricketer, shot.

18
Pavol Bencz, 75, Czechoslovak footballer.
Arthur Bottom, 82, English footballer (York City).
José Cerviño Cerviño, 91, Spanish Roman Catholic prelate, Bishop of Tui-Vigo (1976–1996).
Dick Clark, 82, American television host and producer (American Bandstand, Dick Clark's New Year's Rockin' Eve, Pyramid), heart attack.
Peter Collis, 82, English artist.
Graham Cooper, 75, English cricketer.
Hillman Curtis, 51, American graphic designer and filmmaker, colon cancer.
Tina De Mola, 88, Italian actress, singer and television personality.
John Anthony Golding, 91, Turks and Caicos Islands administrator.
René Lépine, 82, Canadian real estate developer, prostate cancer.
Kristian Lund, 80, Norwegian military officer, engineer and politician.
John O'Neil, 91, American baseball player (Philadelphia Phillies).
Robert O. Ragland, 80, American film score composer.
Sterling Ridge, 75, American politician, Mayor of Glendale, Arizona (1976–1980), three-term member of the Arizona House of Representatives.
Col Saddington, 74, Australian football player.
Naum Shopov, 78, Bulgarian actor.
Åge Storhaug, 74, Norwegian Olympic (1960, 1964) gymnast, cancer. 
Fritz Theilen, 84, German resistance member.
K. D. Wentworth, 61, American science fiction author, cancer and pneumonia.

19
Muhammad Mustafa Badawi, 86, Egyptian academic.
Allison Baden-Clay, 43, Australian executive, murdered.
Leopold David de Rothschild, 84, British financier and philanthropist.
Richard T. Drinnon, 87, American historian.
Ray Easterling, 62, American football player (Atlanta Falcons), suicide by gunshot.
Greg Ham, 58, Australian musician (Men at Work).
Levon Helm, 71, American musician (The Band) and actor (Coal Miner's Daughter), throat cancer.
Mansur Kamaletdinov, 86, Russian ballet dancer and teacher.
Ken Lowrie, 85, Australian politician, member of the Tasmanian Legislative Council (1968–1986).
Jacques Martin, 52, Canadian Paralympian, gold medalist (1984, 1988, 1992, 1996), heart attack.
Enrico Pedrini, 72, Italian art theorist. (Italian)
Murtaza Razvi, 48, Pakistani journalist, strangled.
Chitturi Satyanarayana, 99, Indian surgeon.
Meenakshi Thapar, 26, Indian actress (404), strangled.
Mabel Van Camp, 91, Canadian judge, first woman on the Supreme Court of Ontario.
Valeri Vasiliev, 62, Russian Olympic gold (1972, 1976) and silver (1980) medal-winning ice hockey player.
Zozo Zarpa, 73, Greek actress, heart failure.

20
*Mario Arturo Acosta Chaparro, 70, Mexican army general, shot.
Ayten Alpman, 82, Turkish singer, respiratory failure.
Jack Ashley, Baron Ashley of Stoke, 89, British politician and disability campaigner, MP for Stoke-on-Trent South (1966–1992).
Alfie Biggs, 76, English footballer.
Brian Boland, 80, Australian footballer.
Matt Branam, 57, American academic, President of Rose–Hulman Institute of Technology (since 2009).
Craig Cameron, 66, American ice hockey player.
Peter Carsten, 83, German actor.
George Cowan, 92, American physical chemist and member of Manhattan Project, injuries from a fall.
Clément Haeyen, 84, Belgian Olympic (1960) weightlifter. (Dutch)
Shannon Johnson, 28, American convicted murderer, execution by lethal injection.
Mike Lipari, 79, Canadian Olympic weightlifter.
Joe Muranyi, 84, American jazz musician.
Don Wedge, 82, American football referee (1972–1995).
Bert Weedon, 91, English guitarist and composer.

21
John S. Ballard, 89, American politician.
 Doris Betts, 79, American author, lung cancer.
*Ramón Búa Otero, 78, Spanish Roman Catholic prelate, Bishop of Tarazona (1982–1989) and Calahorra y La Calzada-Logroño (1989–2003).
 Charles Colson, 80, American White House Counsel convicted in Watergate scandal, evangelist, founder of Prison Fellowship, brain hemorrhage.
 Albert Falco, 84, French sea captain and scuba diver. 
 Wim Franken, 90, Dutch composer and pianist.
Lenny Gault, 78, American country music singer, cancer.
Harry Heslet, 92, American baseball player.
Brian Heward, 76, English footballer.
 Charles Higham, 81, English-born American biographer, heart attack.
 Heinz Jentzsch, 92, German racehorse trainer.
Peter Milano, 82, American businessman.
 Frank Odoi, 64, Kenyan cartoonist, road accident.
 Jerry Toppazzini, 80, Canadian ice hockey player (Boston Bruins, Chicago Blackhawks, Detroit Red Wings).

22
 John Amabile, 73, American football scout (New York Giants), coach and player (Boston College).
 Gunnar Göransson, 78, Swedish Olympic cyclist. (Swedish)
 Bill Granger, 70, American author and columnist.
 Matti Kuosku, 71, Swedish Olympic cross-country skier. (Swedish)
 Petr Lisičan, 49, Czech Olympic cross-country skier.
 Buzz Potamkin, 66, American television producer.
 George Rathmann, 84, American businessman, first chief executive of Amgen, kidney failure.
 Aristarkh (Stankevich), 70, Belarusian Orthodox hierarch, Archbishop of Gomel and Zhlobin (since 1990). (Russian)

23
 Navodaya Appachan, 81, Indian film producer, cancer.
 Lillemor Arvidsson, 68, Swedish trade union leader and politician, Governor of Gotland (1998–2004). (Swedish)
Breda Beban, 59, Serbian film and video artist.
 Eunice Bommelyn, 85, American Tolowa cultural advocate, Tolowa language proponent, and historian. 
Peter Boothman, 68–69, Australian guitarist, composer, and educator.
 Hacho Boyadzhiev, 80, Bulgarian television and film director.
 Michael Brinton, 70, British businessman, Lord Lieutenant of Worcestershire (since 2001), cancer.
Yvonne Brown, 59, American politician, cancer.
 Billy Bryans, 64, Canadian musician and producer (Parachute Club), lung cancer.
Carmen Bunster, 94, Chilean actress.
Chang Myung-sam, 48, Korean taekwondo practitioner, car accident.
 Roland Dale, 84, American football player (Washington Redskins).
 Michael DeBose, 58, American politician, Member of the Ohio House of Representatives (2002–2010), complications of Parkinson's disease.
 Chris Ethridge, 65, American country rock bassist (International Submarine Band, The Flying Burrito Brothers), pancreatic cancer.
Veriano Luchetti, 73, Italian opera singer. (Italian)
 Tommy Marth, 33, American musician (The Killers), suicide.
 Raymond Thorsteinsson, 91, Canadian geologist.
 LeRoy T. Walker, 93, American track coach, Chairman of the US Olympic Committee (1992–1996).
 Flo Whyard, 95, Canadian politician, Mayor of Whitehorse (1981–1983), Yukon territorial minister (1975–1978), editor of the Whitehorse Star.

24
Svetlana Berzina, 80, Russian Egyptologist.
Sheena Bora, 25, Indian executive, strangulation.
 Fred Bradley, 91, American baseball player (Chicago White Sox).
 William A. Campbell, 95, American USAF colonel,  member of the Tuskegee Airmen.  
William Chapman, 88, American operatic baritone and stage actor.
 Nell Ginjaar-Maas, 80, Dutch politician, State Secretary for Education and Science (1982–1989). (Dutch)
Daniel McGillivray Brown, 89, Scottish chemist.
 Erast Parmasto, 83, Estonian mycologist.
 Miguel Portas, 53, Portuguese politician, Member of the European Parliament for Portugal (since 2004), lung cancer. (Portuguese)
 Eusebio Razo, Jr., 46, Mexican-born American jockey, explosion.
 Shireen Ritchie, Baroness Ritchie of Brompton, 67, British peer, councillor for Brompton ward, Royal Borough of Kensington and Chelsea (since 1998).
 Yugo Sako, 84, Japanese movie director, aspiration pneumonia. (Japanese)
Village Kid, 31,  Australian standardbred racehorse.
 Amos Vogel, 91, Austrian-born American film scholar, founder of the New York Film Festival and Cinema 16.
 George Vujnovich, 96, American OSS agent and leader of Operation Halyard, natural causes.
 Ambrose Weekes, 93, British Anglican bishop, first Suffragan Bishop in Europe.
Thomas Christian Wyller, 89, Norwegian political scientist.

25
 Gerry Bahen, 83, Australian football player and administrator.
Ben Blacknall, 65, American football player and coach.
 Rolando Ramos Dizon, 67, Filipino educator, Chairman of the Commission on Higher Education (2003–2004).
Ben Gabriel, 94, Australian actor and director.
 Sir Brandon Gough, 74, British businessman, Chancellor of the University of East Anglia (since 2003).
Harry Hicks, 86, British Olympic runner.
Denny Jones, 101, American politician, member of the Oregon House of Representatives (1973–1999).
Moscelyne Larkin, 87, American ballerina.
 Louis le Brocquy, 95, Irish painter.
Stephen Maxwell, 69, Scottish politician.
Hysni Milloshi, 66, Albanian politician.
 Ian Oswald, 82, Scottish sleep researcher.
 Paul L. Smith, 75, American actor (Popeye, Dune, Maverick).
 Jan Bernard Szlaga, 71, Polish Roman Catholic prelate, Bishop of Pelplin (since 1992), duodenal ulcer hemorrhage. 
 Brij Bhushan Tiwari, 71, Indian politician, heart attack.

26
 Jimmy Bond, 79, American musician.
Roy Claughton, 84, Australian politician.
Clarence Cormier, 81, Canadian politician.
 Pete Fornatale, 66, American radio disc jockey (WNEW-FM, WFUV), brain aneurysm.
Franco Fraticelli, 83, Italian film editor.
 Floyd D. Hall, 96, American pilot, chairman and chief executive of Eastern Air Lines.
Ardian Klosi, 55, Albanian political analyst, publicist, and writer, suicide.
Ted Newall, 76, Canadian businessman.
José Martins Ribeiro Nunes, 85, Brazilian naval pilot. 
 Terence Spinks, 74, British Olympic gold medal-winning (1956) boxer.
Margie Stewart, 92, American model and actress.
Chut Wutty, 40, Cambodian environmental activist, shot.

27
Wayne Aiken, 76, Canadian football player.
Ron Ballatore, 71, American swimming coach, bone cancer.
Daniel Boatwright, 82, American politician, California State Senator (1980–1996).
Anatoly Lebed, 48, Russian army officer, Hero of the Russian Federation.
Takayoshi Nagamine, 66, Japanese karate master and trainer.
 František Procházka, 50, Czech Olympic bronze medal-winning (1992) ice hockey player. 
 Ari Magder, 28, Canadian child actor (Shining Time Station), complications from pneumonia.
Harold Pupkewitz, 96, Lithuanian-born Namibian businessman, heart attack.
 René Rouffeteau, 86, French Olympic bronze medal-winning (1948) cyclist. (French)
 Bill Skowron, 81, American baseball player (New York Yankees, Chicago White Sox), heart failure.
Allen Tough, 76, Canadian scientist, complications of multiple system atrophy.
* Abu Mohammad Jawad Walieddine, 96, Lebanese Druze religious leader.
 David Weiss, 65, Swiss artist (Peter Fischli & David Weiss).

28
Sir Fred Allen, 92, New Zealand rugby player, captain, and coach, leukemia.
Bobby Alto, 73, American actor, comedian and performer, complications of stroke.
Charles Barron, 76, Scottish writer, playwright, teacher and lecturer, multi-organ failure.
Harald Bergseth, 88, Norwegian soil scientist.
John Birch, 82, British musician.
Matilde Camus, 92, Spanish poet. (Spanish)
H. Fred Clark, 75, American pediatrician, medical scientist, and social activist.
Giorgio Consolini, 91, Italian singer.
Jim Downing, 65–66, Irish Gaelic footballer.
Joaquín Dualde, 79, Spanish Olympic bronze medal-winning (1960) field hockey player. (Spanish)
Al Ecuyer, 74, American-born Canadian football player (Edmonton Eskimos).
Stein Johnson, 90, Norwegian Olympic (1948, 1952) discus thrower. 
Jackie Kelso, 90, American jazz musician.
Walter Mathews, 85, American actor (General Hospital).
Patricia Medina, 92, British actress, natural causes.
Dudley Peake, 77, Welsh footballer.
Milan N. Popović, 87, Serbian psychiatrist and author. 
Sir John Quinton, 82, British banker (Barclays).
Aberdeen Shikoyi, 27, Kenyan rugby player, spinal cord injury sustained in match play.
Tom Spence, 50, Scottish footballer, suspected heart failure.
Geoffrey Tyler, 91, British educationalist.
Ervin Zádor, 76, Hungarian water polo player, Olympic gold medalist (1956).

29
Amarillo Slim, 83, American professional gambler, winner of the 1972 World Series of Poker main event, colon cancer.
Éric Charden, 69, French singer, lymphoma. 
Wiesław Chrzanowski, 88, Polish politician and professor, Marshal of the Sejm (1991–1993). 
Jean Desmasures, 83, French Olympic field hockey player.
Dynaformer, 27, American racehorse and sire, euthanized.
Shukri Ghanem, 69, Libyan politician, Prime Minister (2003–2006) and Minister of Oil (2006–2011).
Joel Goldsmith, 54, American film and television composer (Stargate), son of Jerry Goldsmith.
Daisy Junor, 92, Canadian baseball player (AAGPBL).
Joram Lindenstrauss, 75, Israeli mathematician.
Jim McCrary, 72, American photographer.
Roland Moreno, 66, French inventor, creator of the smart card. 
Kenny Roberts, 84, American country music singer and yodeler.
Jean Tschabold, 86, Swiss Olympic silver medal-winning (1952) gymnast.
Idar Ulstein, 78, Norwegian businessman, cancer.

30
Cliff Ashby, 92, British poet and novelist.
Finn Benestad, 82, Norwegian musicologist.
Ernst Bolldén, 45, Swedish wheelchair table tennis player and Paralympian gold (1996) and bronze (1996, 2000) medalist, bladder cancer. 
Tomás Borge, 81, Nicaraguan politician and poet, founder of the Sandinista National Liberation Front, pneumonia.
Alexander Dale Oen, 26, Norwegian Olympic silver medal-winning (2008) swimmer, cardiac arrest.
Alexandru Dincă, 66, Romanian handball player.
Bob Finkel, 94, American producer and director, age-related illnesses.
Giannis Gravanis, 54, Greek footballer (Panionios F.C.). 
Andrew Levane, 92, American basketball player (Syracuse Nationals, Milwaukee Hawks) and coach (New York Knicks, St. Louis Bombers).
William Burley Lockwood, 95, British linguist.
George Murdock, 81, American actor (Barney Miller, Battlestar Galactica, The X-Files), cancer.
Billy Neighbors, 72, American football player (Boston Patriots, Miami Dolphins), heart attack.
Benzion Netanyahu, 102, Israeli historian, academic, and Revisionist Zionist activist, father of Benjamin Netanyahu.
Arturo Andrés Roig, 89, Argentine philosopher. 
Achala Sachdev, 91, Indian actress.
Sicelo Shiceka, 45, South African politician, Minister of Cooperative Governance and Traditional Affairs (since 2009).

References

2012-04
 04